Wicklow is a civil parish in Carleton County, New Brunswick, Canada, forming the northwestern corner of Carleton County. It comprises a single local service district and parts of one town and one village, all of which are members of the Western Valley Regional Service Commission (WVRSC).

The Census subdivision of Wicklow Parish includes all of the parish outside the two municipalities.

Origin of name
The parish may have been named after the town of Wicklow or County Wicklow in Ireland. William Francis Ganong listed its origin as uncertain.

History
Wicklow was erected in 1833 as part of the five-way split of Kent Parish. The parish extended west to include part of Maine claimed by New Brunswick.

Boundaries
Wicklow Parish is bounded:

 on the west by the international border;
 on the north by the River de Chute;
 on the east by the Saint John River;
 and on the south by southern line of a land grant at the mouth of Whitemarsh Brook and its prolongation to the international border.
 It also includes any islands in front of it in the Saint John River.

Evolution of boundaries
Wicklow's southern boundary originally paralleled the northern boundary of Woodstock Parish, running closer to due west than its present course. The eastern boundary was the Saint John River.

In 1842 New Brunswick's land boundary with Maine was settled by the Webster–Ashburton Treaty, ending Wicklow's implicit claim to part of the state.

In 1850 the boundary within the Saint John River was altered, adding any islands in front of the parish to Wicklow. The southern boundary was moved north more than a kilometre to the northern line of a three-lot grant to Henry M. Green, taking a strip of the parish that included the northern part of Centreville.

In 1870 the boundary with Simonds and Wilmot Parishes was moved south to start at its original point at the mouth of the Whitemarsh but then run westerly along the prolongation of the northern line of southernmost lot of the grant to Henry M. Green.

Municipalities
The town of Florenceville-Bristol extends into a small area in the southeastern corner along Routes 110 and 130.

The village of  Centreville straddles the southern parish line along Route 110, Route 560, and Gregg Settlement Road.

Local service district
The local service district of the parish of Wicklow comprises all of the parish outside the two municipalities.

The LSD was established in 1966 to assess for fire protection. Community services were added in 1967.

Today the LSD assessed for the basic LSD services of fire protection, police services, land use planning, emergency measures, and dog control. The taxing authority is 216.00 Wicklow.

LSD advisory committee: Unknown.

Communities
Communities at least partly within the parish; bold indicates an incorporated municipality

   Centreville
 Clearview
 Florenceville-Bristol
 Greenfield
 Gregg Settlement
 Hartley Settlement
  Knoxford
 Lamoreaux Corner
 Listerville
 Lower Greenfield
 Lower Royalton
  McGrath Corner
 McMonagle Corner
 Orchards Corner
 River de Chute
  Royalton
 Summerfield
 Thomas Corner
 Tracey Mills
 Tweedie
 Upper Knoxford
 Upper Royalton
 Upper Wicklow
 Wakem Corner
  Wicklow

Bodies of water
Bodies of water at least partly in the parish:

 River de Chute
  Saint John River
 Big Presque Isle Stream
 Whitemarsh Creek
 Barrett Lake
 Carlisle Lakes
 Lawrence Lakes
 Leith Lake
 Reid Lake
 Round Lake
 Tweedie Lake

Islands
Islands at least partly in the parish:
 Green Island

Other notable places
Parks, historic sites, and other noteworthy places at least partly in the parish.
 Beechwood Dam
 Green Island Protected Natural Area
 River de Chute Protected Natural Area

Demographics
Parish population total does not include portions within  Centreville and Florenceville-Bristol

Population
Population trend

Language
Mother tongue (2016)

See also
List of parishes in New Brunswick

Notes

References

Local service districts of Carleton County, New Brunswick
Parishes of Carleton County, New Brunswick